Spermatobium is a genus of parasites of the phylum Apicomplexa. It infects oligochaete worms.

History

This genus was described by Eisen in 1895. This genus has been little studied and not much is known about it.

Taxonomy

Two species in this genus have been described: Spermatobium eclipidrili and Spermatobium freundi. The type species is  S. eclipidrili.

Description

This parasite infects the sperm sacs of oligochaete worms. The sporogonia contain numerous sporoblasts or spores and a residuum.

References

Aconoidasida
Apicomplexa genera